The 1915 SAFL Grand Final was an Australian rules football competition.  beat  46 to 34.

References

SANFL Grand Finals
1915 SAFL Grand Final